John Aloysius Doyle (January 1, 1858 – December 24, 1915) was a Major League Baseball pitcher. Doyle pitched in 3 games for the St. Louis Brown Stockings in 1882 and recorded a loss in all 3.

External links

1858 births
1915 deaths
Major League Baseball pitchers
St. Louis Brown Stockings (AA) players
Major League Baseball players from Canada
Canadian emigrants to the United States
Fordham Rams baseball players
Sportspeople from Halifax, Nova Scotia
Baseball players from Providence, Rhode Island
19th-century baseball players
Brooklyn Grays (Interstate Association) players
Baseball people from Nova Scotia